Ṛe, also Aṛ, is a letter of the extended Arabic alphabet, based on rāʾ with the addition of a diacritical ṭāʾ (historically four dots in a square pattern) on top. It is not used in the Arabic alphabet itself, but is used to represent the word-medial and word-final retroflex flap [ɽ] in Urdu, Punjabi written in the Shahmukhi script, and Kashmiri. The small t̤oʾe diacritic is used to indicate a retroflex consonant in Urdu. Its Abjad value is considered to be 200. In Urdu, this letter may also be called rā-ye-musaqqalā ("heavy re") or rā-ye-hindiyā ("Indian re"). In Devanagari, this consonant is rendered using ‘ड़’ (‘ड’ with nuqta below).

Character encoding

References

Arabic letters